Robert Doran may refer to:

 Robert Doran (born 1940), a scholar of Judaism and Christianity in antiquity
 Robert M. Doran (1939–2021), a Canadian theologian
 Robert S. Doran (born 1937), an American mathematician
 Robert W. Doran, a New Zealand computer scientist
 Bob Doran, a character in the James Joyce novel Ulysses

See also
 Jim Doran (James Robert Doran), American football player
 Walter Robert Butler Doran (1861–1945), British army officer